Strangers is a 1992 American erotic drama anthology television miniseries directed  by Daniel Vigne, Joan Tewkesbury and Wayne Wang and starring  Linda Fiorentino, Joan Chen  and Timothy Hutton. It was broadcast in three parts on HBO.

Plot

Cast 
 
  Linda Fiorentino as Helen
  Joan Chen as The Girl
  Timothy Hutton as Tom
  James Remar as Bernard
  Lambert Wilson as The Guy
  Alexandra Vandernoot as The Woman 
 François Montagut  as The Frenchman

References

External links 

American erotic drama films
1990s erotic drama films
1990s American television miniseries
HBO original programming
Films directed by Wayne Wang
Films scored by Maurice Jarre
1992 drama films
1992 films
1990s American films